NPPL: Championship Paintball 2009 is a first-person paintball simulation game developed by Sand Grain Studios and released in 2008 for Xbox 360, PlayStation 2, PlayStation 3 and Wii.

The game strives to emulate the sport of paintball, specifically the National Professional Paintball League. Various game modes are present in Championship Paintball 2009, along with a career mode, licensed paintball gear, locations and layouts based on the NPPL, the Millennium European Paintball Series, and the XPSL.

References

External links
Official Website
IGN.com Game Review
IGN.com Press Release
Team Xbox Announcement
Gaming Excellence Press Release
EB Games Product Order

2008 video games
Activision games
PlayStation 2 games
PlayStation 3 games
Video games developed in Romania
Wii games
Xbox 360 games
First-person shooters
Sand Grain Studios games
Multiplayer and single-player video games
Paintball video games